Gutiyari Lal Duwesh is an Indian politician and member of the 15th and the 16th Legislative assemblies of Uttar Pradesh. Duwesh represented the Agra Cantt. constituency of Uttar Pradesh and is a member of the Bahujan Samaj Party political party. On 12 March 2019, in Lucknow he has joined Bhartiya Janata Party and left Bahujan Samaj Party having the Supremo Km. Mayawati. This is one of the biggest shocks to the B.S.P. because since then, nothing is running smoothly in B.S.P. community.

Early life and education 
Gutiyari Lal Duwesh was born in the village Bartai in Bharatpur, Rajasthan, India in 1970. He belongs to the scheduled caste community (Jatav). Duwesh's highest attained education is high school. Prior to entering politics, he was a businessperson by profession.

Political career 

Gutiyari Lal Duwesh has been a MLA for two terms (2007 & 2012). During both his two terms, he represented Agra West (ceased to exist after "Delimitation of Parliamentary and Assembly Constituencies Order, 2008") and Agra Cantt. assembly constituencies respectively. He is a member of the Bahujan Samaj Party.

Posts Held

See also 

 Agra Cantt.
 Uttar Pradesh Legislative Assembly
 16th Legislative Assembly of Uttar Pradesh
 Politics of India
 Bahujan Samaj Party

References 

Bahujan Samaj Party politicians from Uttar Pradesh
Politicians from Agra
1970 births
Living people
Uttar Pradesh MLAs 2012–2017
Uttar Pradesh MLAs 2007–2012